"If You Change Your Mind" is a song recorded by American country music artist Rosanne Cash who co-wrote the song with Hank DeVito.  It was released in March 1988 as the third single from the album King's Record Shop.  The song was Cash's ninth number one on the country chart.  The single went to number one for one week and spent a total of 15 weeks on the country chart.

Charts

Weekly charts

Year-end charts

References

1988 singles
Rosanne Cash songs
Songs written by Rosanne Cash
Columbia Records singles
1988 songs
Songs written by Hank DeVito
Song recordings produced by Rodney Crowell